Raimundos is the first album by the Brazilian hardcore punk band Raimundos, released in 1994 through Banguela Records. Recorded over a few weeks in Estúdio Be Bop, in São Paulo, it has sold 120,000 copies.

Track listing

Personnel
 Digão - guitar
 Rodolfo Abrantes - lead vocals
 Canisso - bass guitar
 Fred Castro - drums

Additional Musicians
 Carlos Eduardo Miranda - vocals (4), pandeiro (13)
 Guilherme Bonolo - vocals (1, 2, 4, 7, 8, 12, 13), lead guitar (3, 16)
 João Gordo - vocals (3)
 Paulo Miklos - vocals (6, 10, 11)
 Sérgio Britto - vocals (6, 10, 11)
 Branco Mello - vocals (6, 10, 11)
 Nando Reis - acoustic guitar (1), viola (16)
 Zenilton - accordion (9, 12)

References

1994 debut albums
Raimundos albums